The 2012 Puerto Rico Republican presidential primary took place on March 18, 2012.

On January 18, 2012, Secretary of State Kenneth McClintock announced that seven candidates, including Newt Gingrich, Mitt Romney, Rick Santorum, Ron Paul and Rick Perry (who has since withdrawn and endorsed Gingrich) would be eligible to appear on the March 18 ballot unless they notified McClintock by February 17 of their desire not to compete in Puerto Rico.  If a candidate received a majority of the votes, then the primary was to be winner-take-all, but if no candidate met the 50% threshold, its 20 delegates were to be divided proportionally.

On February 20, 2012, the Republican Party of Puerto Rico announced the six candidate names and their order on the ballot for the island's March 18 presidential primary.

Results
Prior to certification:

Controversies

Santorum remarks about use of English in Puerto Rico

In 2012 U.S. presidential candidate Rick Santorum was criticized during the runup to the Puerto Rican Republican primary for stating that if Puerto Rico opted to become a state, it would have to make English its primary language. As The New York Times reported:

See also 
 Republican Party presidential primaries, 2012
 Results of the 2012 Republican Party presidential primaries
 Puerto Rico Republican Party

References

External links
The Green Papers: for Puerto Rico
The Green Papers: Major state elections in chronological order

Puerto Rico
Republican
2012